Chýně is a municipality and village in Prague-West District in the Central Bohemian Region of the Czech Republic. It has about 4,300 inhabitants. The municipality is a suburb of Prague.

Geography
It lies in an agricultural landscape of the Prague Plateau.

The Litovický stream runs east along the northern border and supplies two small ponds. The upper pond is called Bašta and is used for recreational purposes. The lower pond is called Strahovský.

History
The area of the municipality has been inhabited since prehistoric times. Iron furnaces that were found here are the oldest examples known in Bohemia and Moravia. The first written mention of Chýně is from 1273.

The village used to belong to Strahov Monastery and until recently it was a small farming community. Proximity to Prague, the airport, and the motorway to Plzeň led in the 1990s to the development of some logistics and construction industries. The municipality has grown considerably with some large housing developments to the west, and it is losing some of its rural character.

Economy
Chýně has a small industrial area in the east.

Transport
Public transport consists mostly of buses to Prague districts of Zličín and Motol, but it is evolving with new lines and increased frequences. Chýně is also served by two railway stations on the line from Prague to Kladno, but one of the stations lies just across the municipal border.

References

External links

Villages in Prague-West District